is a passenger railway station located in the city of Imabari, Ehime Prefecture, Japan. It is operated by JR Shikoku and has the station number "Y39".

Lines
Iyo-Tomita Station is served by the JR Shikoku Yosan Line and is located 141.6 km from the beginning of the line at Takamatsu Station. Connections with other local or limited express trains are needed to travel further east or west along the line.

Layout
The station consists of two opposed side platforms serving two tracks. The station building is unstaffed and serves only as a waiting room. Access to the opposite platform, which also has a weather shelter, is by means of a footbridge. Parking is available at the station forecourt. A siding branches off line 1 and leads to a vehicle shed.

Adjacent stations

History
At that time the station was operated by Japanese Government Railways, later becoming Japanese National Railways (JNR). With the privatization of JNR on 1 April 1987, control of the station passed to JR Shikoku.

Surrounding area
Imabari Municipal Tomita Elementary School

See also
 List of railway stations in Japan

References

External links

Station timetable

Railway stations in Ehime Prefecture
Railway stations in Japan opened in 1924
Imabari, Ehime